Gavdaneh Khvor (also Romanized as Gāvdāneh Khvor and Gāvdāneh Khvār) is a village in Howmeh-ye Kerend Rural District, in the Central District of Dalahu County, Kermanshah Province, Iran. At the 2006 census, its population was 540, in 111 families.

References 

Populated places in Dalahu County